Pseudopanax ferox, the toothed lancewood or horoeka, is a small tree endemic to New Zealand. It is similar to the more common lancewood, Pseudopanax crassifolius, but with more prominently tooth-shaped leaves. The juvenile leaves are a very dark grey-brown to grey-green colour, narrow, stiff and up to 40 cm long. Once the slow growing tree reaches maturity at 10 to 15 years, the leaf form becomes shorter, wider and dark green in colour. It is only in adulthood that the tree's shape changes from one central stem and downward growing leaves to a more typical tree shape with branches spreading to build a round head. A mature toothed lancewood can reach 6 metres height with a trunk of up to 25 cm in diameter. The mature trunk has distinctive longitudinal grooves which sometimes twist slightly.

The tree is sometimes also called fierce lancewood in reference to its fierce looking saw tooth shaped juvenile leaves.

Use
Toothed lancewood used to be rare in cultivation, but is now a favoured gardening plant in New Zealand. It gained wide popularity following its use in the gold-medal winning New Zealand exhibit at the 2004 Chelsea Flower Show in the UK. The distinctive leaves and juvenile shape lend themselves to use in narrow spaces and are often used to complement modern building architecture. Due to its slow growth and relatively small size for a tree – even once mature – it is one of few trees innately suitable for small gardens.

Literary References
Lancewood, a 1999 war novel by New Zealand author Alan Marshall references this plant as a metaphor for the taking up of arms to protect New Zealand during World War II. There are many long passages reflecting upon the form of the Lancewood, for example:

"A bizarre jagged gem of the forest with leaves lancing out at all angles; each blade a blade -- deeply serrated to create a satanic botanic sword".

Planting
Planting is best done in free draining soil in any semi-shaded to sunny position. Leaves are more numerous in sunny situations, which is noticeable on young specimens.  Toothed lancewood is generally hardy and can withstand some minor frost damage to the tip (which may cause it to branch). It is also tolerant of dry locations and high winds.

References

New Zealand Plant Conservation Network, URL:Pseudopanax ferox. Accessed 2010-10-04.

ferox
Trees of New Zealand
Trees of mild maritime climate
Ornamental trees
Near threatened plants
Plants described in 1890